This article lists political parties in New Caledonia.

New Caledonia has a number of strong, well-developed political parties because of the use of proportional representation in the island's Congress.

The major issue dividing the parties is the question of independence.

Political parties

See also
 Politics of New Caledonia
 List of political parties by country

New Caledonia
 
Political parties
+New Caledonia
New Caledonia

Political parties